HD 107146 is a star in the constellation Coma Berenices that is located about  from Earth. The apparent magnitude of 7.028 makes this star too faint to be seen with the unaided eye.

The physical properties of this star are similar to the Sun, including the stellar classification G2V, making this a solar analog. The mass of this star is about 109% of the solar mass and it has about 99% the radius of the Sun. It is a young star with an age between 80 and 200 Myr. The axis of rotation is estimated at  degrees to the line of sight and it completes a rotation in a relatively brief 3.5 days.

Circumstellar disc
In 2003, astronomers recognized the excess infrared and submillimeter emission indicative of circumstellar dust, the first time such a debris disk phenomenon was noted around a star of similar spectral types to the Sun, though having a much younger age. In 2004 the Hubble Space Telescope detected the presence of a spatially resolved disk surrounding the star.

Analysis of the debris disk in the far-infrared and submillimeter wavelengths, carried out using the Hubble Space Telescope, suggests the presence of small grains in the disk. An analysis published in 2009 suggests the possible presence of a planet at a separation of 45-75 AU, in the wide gap centered at 75.4 AU which may be carved by the planet, but no planet with mass exceeding 1-2  was observed in the gap.

Gallery

References

Coma Berenices
107146
G-type main-sequence stars
Circumstellar disks
060074
BD+17 246
Solar analogs
J12190650+1632541
Hypothetical planetary systems